Iblis is a 2018 Indian Malayalam-language fantasy comedy film directed by Rohith V. S. with Asif Ali and Madonna Sebastian starring. The film was produced by Ichais Productions. The film was released on 3 August 2018.

Synopsis
The film is set in the 1980s and contains themes of fantasy and magical realism and also the film tells about life, death and life after death.

Plot
Vaisakhan lives in an unknown land, playing music at the homes where someone has died. He is a carefree youth, who is madly in love with Fida. His concepts of death and afterlife have heavily been influenced by his "muthassan" or grandpa, Sreedharan.

This muthassan is a weird character who enjoys his life, travelling like a nomad. He is a funny character who even plans to make Vaisakhan and Fida fall in love.

Cast

Asif Ali as Vaishakan
Madonna Sebastian as Fida, love interest of Vaishakan
Lal as Shreedharan
Siddique as Jabbar
Rugmini Amma as Beevi
Saiju Kurup as Sukumaran
Sreenath Bhasi as Attar merchant/Subair
Adhish Praveen as Musthafa
Shivakumar Nair as Josettan
Nazeer as Kelu
Gokulan as Vareed
Babu Annur as Sulaiman, Fida's father
Aju Varghese as King (cameo appearance)

Production
Iblis is the second directorial of Rohith V. S. with Asif Ali after his debut film Adventures of Omanakuttan (2017). The film is set in the 1980s, Rohith describes the film a "musical adventure-comedy", planned on the lines of Jagga Jasoos. Rohith discussed the project with Asif during the filming of Adventures of Omanakuttan and also retained its co-writer Sameer Abdul and cinematographer Akhil George for Iblis. Asif too contributed to the script. It was produced by the company Ichais Productions, in their debut. Iblis has music composed by Dawn Vincent. A pooja function for the film was held in early March 2018.

Release

The film was released on 3 August 2018.

References

External links

2010s Malayalam-language films
Indian fantasy comedy films
2010s fantasy comedy films
2018 comedy films